Marriott Edgar (5 October 1880 – 5 May 1951), born George Marriott Edgar in Kirkcudbright, Scotland, was a British poet, scriptwriter and comedian, best known for writing many of the monologues performed by Stanley Holloway, particularly the Albert series. In total he wrote sixteen monologues for Holloway, whilst Holloway himself wrote only five.

Family background
Edgar's great grandfather was James Henry Marriott. His parents were Jane (also known as Jenny; née Taylor), born in London in 1856, and Richard Horatio Marriott Edgar (1847–1894), only son of Alice Marriott (1824–1900), proprietress of the Marriott family theatre troupe. Richard was born in Manchester (then Lancashire), near Christmas 1847 as Richard Horatio Marriott; both his two sisters, Adeline Marriott (b. 1853) and Grace Marriott (b. 1858) were also born in Lancashire, all three out of wedlock. Later all three took the surname of their mother's husband, Robert Edgar, whom she married in 1856.

Richard and Jane married in March 1875, with Richard being unaware that he had fathered an illegitimate namesake son, Richard Horatio Edgar Wallace, with widowed actress Mrs Mary Jane "Polly" Richards, after a brief sexual encounter. Polly, having invented an obligation in London to hide her pregnancy, gave birth in secret on 1 April 1875, almost a month after Richard and Jenny married. This son became the famous journalist, novelist, playwright and screenplay writer, Edgar Wallace.

Richard and Jenny Taylor's children were Alice Marriott Edgar (b. 1876, London), twins Richard and Jennifer Marriott Edgar (b. 1878, London), after whose births the family moved to Scotland, where George was born on 5 October 1880, then returning to London, where Joseph Marriott Edgar was born in 1884 and Adeline Alice Edgar in 1886.

Early career
George Marriott Edgar was a performer, poet and writer. He began his career as a scene-painter, but from 1907 until his death, he was known to the public as a comedian who played pantomime dames. During the First World War he served with the Royal Sussex Regiment and the Mechanical Transport, and afterwards he toured Australia, New Zealand and South Africa with his dame act. In 1929, he joined the cast of The Co-Optimists and worked with Stanley Holloway. 

At the start of the 1930s they went to Hollywood, where Edgar – who had dropped his first name for the professional appellation Marriott Edgar – met his half-brother Edgar Wallace.

Monologues

Holloway was already enjoying some success with the monologue format, with such classics as Sam, Pick Oop Tha' Musket. Edgar asked him if he had heard a story about a couple who had taken their son to the zoo, only to see the lad eaten by a lion. Holloway had indeed heard the story, and shortly afterwards Edgar supplied him with a script.  The Lion and Albert became one of Holloway's most popular pieces, one of many he recorded beginning in 1930. The lion of the poem is named "Wallace", which was the name of the first African lion to be bred in Britain, living from 1812 until 1838, and his name became a popular one for lions. Edgar gave the poem the title The Lion and Albert, but some later performances and re-publications used the form Albert and the Lion. A pub on Blackpool Promenade also uses the latter form.

The monologues were designed to be spoken rhythmically with piano accompaniment, which in many cases was also composed by Edgar. The texts were published by Francis, Day & Hunter Ltd. during the 1930s in three collections. All were illustrated by John Hassall, many of whose lively images also became classics. Edgar's compositions were
Albert 'Arold and Others – performed by Stanley Holloway and Marriott Edgar
The Lion and Albert: Albert swallowed by a lion in the menagerie of Blackpool Tower
Runcorn Ferry (Tuppence per Person per Trip), set in Runcorn
Three Ha'pence a Foot, featuring an argument with Noah
The Battle of Hastings, an account of the Battle of Hastings
Marksman Sam, featuring Stanley Holloway's creation Sam Small
Albert and the 'Eadsman, set in the Tower of London
The Return of Albert (Albert Comes Back), sequel to The Lion and Albert
Goalkeeper Joe, set in Wigan
Gunner Joe, at the Battle of Trafalgar
The Jubilee Sov'rin, the awkward loss of a sovereign commemorating Queen Victoria's Diamond Jubilee
The Magna Charter, the signing of Magna Carta
Little Aggie, an elephant
Albert and Balbus and Samuel Small – written and performed by Marriott Edgar
The 'Ole in the Ark, a necessary repair to Noah's Ark
Sam's Racehorse, an unfortunate purchase
George and the Dragon, an unhelpful pub landlady
The Recumbent Posture, a linguistic misunderstanding
The Channel Swimmer, an attempt on the English Channel
Asparagus, a cautionary tale
Uppards, a Lancashire version of Longfellow's famous poem Excelsior
Joe Ramsbottom, a farmer and the squire
Burghers of Calais, retelling the story of the Burghers of Calais
Balbus (The Great Wall of China), a fantasy based on the Latin textbook example: "Balbus built a wall"
Jonah and the Grampus, the story of Jonah
Normans and Saxons and Such – some Ancient History
Canute the Great 1017–1035, about Cnut the Great
William Rufus 1087–1100, about William II of England
Queen Matilda 1100–1135, about Empress Matilda
The Fair Rosamond 1154–1189, about Rosamund Clifford
Richard Cœur-de-Lion 1189–1199, about Richard I of England
Henry the Seventh 1485–1509, about Henry VII of England

The Lion and Albert and The Return of Albert have been translated into German under the titles Der Löwe und Albert and Albert kommt wieder, na klar! respectively. The Lion and Albert has been performed as a two-part song of eighteen verses to an Irish folk tune by Kathy Hampson's Free Elastic Band.

In 1991, BBC Radio 4 broadcast a series of eight programmes entitled Marriott's Monologues, with a different monologist in each programme performing Marriott's monologues with piano accompaniment and discussing the monologues. The monologists included Dame Thora Hird, Betty Driver, Les Dawson, Roy Hudd, Kenneth Waller, Peter Goodwright, Bernie Clifton and Roy Castle.

Film scriptwriting
Edgar worked for Gainsborough Pictures between 1936 and 1944, as a scriptwriter for a number of British films (mostly comedies) such as:

 Here's George (1932)
 Rolling Home (1935)
Windbag the Sailor (1936)
Oh, Mr Porter! (1937)
 O-Kay for Sound (1937)
Good Morning, Boys (1937)
Said O'Reilly to McNab (1937)
Convict 99 (1938)
Alf's Button Afloat (1938)
Old Bones of the River (1938)
Ask a Policeman (1939)
The Frozen Limits (1939)
Charley's (Big-Hearted) Aunt (1940)
Band Waggon (1940)
Where's That Fire? (1940)
The Ghost Train (1941)
Gasbags (1941)
 Hi Gang! (1941)
I Thank You (1941)
Back-Room Boy (1942)
King Arthur Was a Gentleman (1942)
Miss London Ltd. (1943)
Bees in Paradise (1944)

Marriage and family
Edgar married Mildred Williams in Brentford in 1904. They had a son, Hindle (1905–1985), who was an actor.

Edgar died in Battle, East Sussex, on 5 May 1951. He was 70 years old.

References

External links

Monologues
More Marriott Edgar monologues
All Marriott Edgar monologues with a preface for each one
Play by Marriott Edgar on Great War Theatre website

1880 births
1951 deaths
People from Kirkcudbright
English male poets
20th-century English poets
20th-century English male writers
British male screenwriters
20th-century British screenwriters
Pantomime dames
20th-century English comedians